Mark Weatherford is an American cybersecurity professional who has held a variety of executive level positions in both the public and private sectors. He was appointed as the first deputy under secretary for cybersecurity at the US Department of Homeland Security from 2011 to 2013. He is currently the Global Information Security Strategist for Booking Holdings.

Weatherford is a graduate of the University of Arizona in Tucson, Arizona, and received his master's degree from the Naval Postgraduate School in Monterey, California.  He holds the Certified Information Systems Security Professional (CISSP) certification.

He is a former US Navy cryptologic officer and led the Navy’s Computer Network Defense operations and the Naval Computer Incident Response Team (NAVCIRT).

Before joining the DHS, he served (2010–11) as the vice president and chief security officer of the North American Electric Reliability Corporation (NERC), where he directed the organization’s critical infrastructure and cybersecurity program for electric utilities across North America. He was also appointed by Governor Arnold Schwarzenegger as the state of California's first Chief Information Security Officer in the Office of Information Security (2008–09), and was also the first Chief Information Security Officer (CISO) for the State of Colorado (2004–07), where he was appointed by both Governor Bill Owens and Governor Bill Ritter. Most notably, he helped establish the state’s first cybersecurity program and spearheaded some of the nation's first cybersecurity legislation aimed to protect citizens. 

After leaving the DHS, he was a principal with the Chertoff Group in Washington DC, and senior vice president and chief cybersecurity strategist of vArmour.

Weatherford was one of Information Security magazine’s "Security 7 Award" winners in 2008 and was awarded SC Magazines "CSO of the Year" award in 2010, In 2012 and 2013 he was named one of the "10 Most Influential People in Government Information Security" by GovInfoSecurity. He is a member of the Marysville High School, Marysville, California, Hall of Fame and was  inducted into the Information Systems Security Association (ISSA) International Hall of Fame in October 2018.

References

External links 
Chertoff Group

Obama administration personnel
United States Department of Homeland Security officials
University of Arizona alumni
Naval Postgraduate School alumni
People associated with computer security
Living people
1956 births
People from Marysville, California